Tanguy Turgis (born 16 May 1998) is a French former professional cyclist, who rode professionally in 2018 before retiring due to health reasons. His brothers Jimmy Turgis and Anthony Turgis are also cyclists.

Career
From August 2017, he rode for UCI Professional Continental team  as a stagiaire. 

Turgis joined UCI Professional Continental team  for the 2018 season. He rode in Paris–Roubaix, finishing in 42nd place. This made him the first teenager to finish the race since 1962. He also rode in Gent–Wevelgem and the E3 Harelbeke, all spring classics. He celebrated his first major top-10 finish in a 1.HC rated event, the Handzame Classic.

In late 2018 Turgis was diagnosed with a congenital heart malformation and had to end his bicycle racing career.

Major results

2015
 5th Bernaudeau Junior
 9th Paris–Roubaix Juniors
2016
 1st Bernaudeau Junior
 2nd Overall GP Gènèral Patton
1st Stage 2
 3rd Paris–Roubaix Juniors
 3rd Time trial, National Junior Road Championships
 5th Overall Tour du Pays de Vaud
1st Stage 3
2017
 1st Omloop Het Nieuwsblad Beloften
 9th Dorpenomloop Rucphen
2018
 8th Handzame Classic

References

External links

1998 births
Living people
French male cyclists
Cyclists from Île-de-France
People from Bourg-la-Reine
Sportspeople from Hauts-de-Seine